"Maybe Baby" is a rock-and-roll song written by Buddy Holly and the producer Norman Petty, and recorded by Holly and the Crickets in 1957. The single, released in January 1958 and credited to the Crickets, was a Top 40 hit in the U.S., the UK, and Canada.

Background

"Maybe Baby", originally recorded by Holly and the Crickets in 1957, reached number 17 on the US charts and number 4 on the UK chart; Holly toured in the UK that year (see Buddy Holly discography). The single also reached number 8 on the Billboard R&B chart and number 9 on the Canadian charts. The rather simple lyrics are augmented by a twangy percussive accompaniment, characteristic of rockabilly, which is especially effective in the 8-bar instrumental introduction and the short conclusion.

"Maybe Baby" was recorded at Tinker Air Force Base in Midwest City, Oklahoma on September 29, 1957, while Buddy Holly and The Crickets were on a tour (and played that same night, at Oklahoma City Municipal Auditorium with the Show Of Stars '57). Jerry Allison from The Crickets personally remembers that the song, along with three others, was recorded at Tinker Air Force Base. Graham Pugh, a Buddy Holly researcher from the Oklahoma City area, also has seen airplane tickets documenting the fact that Buddy Holly and The Crickets landed at Will Rogers World Airport in Oklahoma City on September 28, 1957.

Personnel 
 Buddy Holly – lead vocals, lead guitar
 Jerry Allison – drums
 Joe B. Mauldin – contrabass
 Niki Sullivan – rhythm guitar

Covers

Bobby Vee released a version in 1963.
Jackie DeShannon released a version of the song on her 1964 album Breakin' It Up On the Beatles Tour!
Skeeter Davis recorded the song in 1967.
The Beatles recorded the song on January 29, 1969, during the Let It Be–Get Back sessions (Sulpy and Schweighardt 29.8).
The folksinger Phil Ochs played the song in concert in early 1970, when Ochs was using electric instruments and covered many songs from the 1950s.
The band Gallery released a cover version on its 1972 album Nice to Be with You.
The country music artist Susie Allanson released a cover in 1978, which reached number 7 on the U.S. Country chart and number 14 on the Canadian country chart.
The Hollies recorded the song in 1980.
Louise Mandrell recorded the song in 1987 on her RCA album titled "dream'in" it was never released a single.
Don McLean recorded the song in 1989.
The Serbian band Eva Braun covered the song in an acoustic session in 1993.
Connie Francis recorded the song in 1996.
Hank Marvin released a version of the song in 1996.
The Nitty Gritty Dirt Band covered the song in 1996.
Brian May, the guitarist for the band Queen, covered the song as the B-side of his single "Business" in 1998 and included it on his EMI album Red Special, released only in Japan.
Paul McCartney covered the song on the soundtrack for the British film Maybe Baby.
Esquerita covered the song for the album Esquerita! in 2010.
Pat Monahan, of the band Train, contributed a cover version to the tribute album Listen to Me: Buddy Holly, released in 2011.

References

Sources
Amburn, Ellis (1996). Buddy Holly: A Biography. St. Martin's Press. .
Bustard, Anne (2005). Buddy: The Story of Buddy Holly. Simon & Schuster. .
Dawson, Jim; Leigh, Spencer (1996). Memories of Buddy Holly. Big Nickel Publications. .
Goldrosen, John; Beecher, John (1996). Remembering Buddy: The Definitive Biography. New York: Da Capo Press. .
Goldrosen, John (1975). Buddy Holly: His Life and Music. Popular Press. 

Rockabilly songs
Buddy Holly songs
1958 singles
1957 songs
Susie Allanson songs
Songs written by Buddy Holly
Songs written by Norman Petty
Brunswick Records singles
The Crickets songs